Gainesville Municipal Airport  is three miles west of Gainesville, in Cooke County, Texas.

History
The airport opened in August 1941 as Gainesville Army Airfield and was used by the United States Army Air Forces Third Air Force as a training base to provide photographic intelligence for air and ground forces.

Known units which trained at Gainesville were the 8th and 426th Reconnaissance Groups. They flew a variety of aircraft, including the P-38 Lightning (F-5), P-51 Mustang (F-6), B-24 Liberator (F-7) and P-40 Warhawk.

The 8th Reconnaissance group was deployed to India in 1944 to support 10th and 14th Air Forces in the China-Burma-India (CBI) Theater.

Reassigned from Third Air Force in April 1944 to AAF Central Flying Training Command.  Hosted AAF Pilot School (Advanced, Single Engine).  At the end of the war the airfield was determined to be excess by the military and turned over to the local government for civil use.

For a year or two around 1951 Gainesville had scheduled airline flights—Central DC-3s.

Facilities

In the year ending August 30, 2005 the airport had 20,200 aircraft operations, average 55 per day: 99.5% general aviation and 0.5% military. 70 aircraft were then based at this airport: 66% single-engine, 21% multi-engine, 9% jet, 3% helicopter and 1% ultralight.

Since at least 2006, the Aviatian Traders ATL-98 Carvair, tailnumber N89FA (aka "Miss 1944") has been based at Gainesville. It is one of 22 modified DC-4 airframes and was seen in the  James Bond movie, Goldfinger.

See also

 Texas World War II Army Airfields

References

 Manning, Thomas A. (2005), History of Air Education and Training Command, 1942–2002.  Office of History and Research, Headquarters, AETC, Randolph AFB, Texas 
 Shaw, Frederick J. (2004), Locating Air Force Base Sites, History’s Legacy, Air Force History and Museums Program, United States Air Force, Washington DC. 
 Thole, Lou (1999), Forgotten Fields of America : World War II Bases and Training, Then and Now – Vol. 2.  Publisher: Pictorial Histories Pub,

External links
 

1941 establishments in Texas
Airfields of the United States Army Air Forces in Texas
Airports in Texas
Buildings and structures in Cooke County, Texas
Transportation in Cooke County, Texas
Airports established in 1941